The 1983 Copa América football tournament was played between 10 August and 4 November, with all ten CONMEBOL members participating. Defending champions Paraguay received a bye into the semi-finals.

Squads

Group stage 

The teams were drawn into three groups, consisting of three teams each. Each team played twice (home and away) against the other teams in their group, with two points for a win, one point for a draw, and zero points for a loss. The winner of each group advanced to the semi-finals.

Paraguay qualified automatically as holders for the semifinal.

Group A

Group B

Group C

Knockout stage

Semi-finals 

Uruguay won 3–1 on points.

2–2 on points. Brazil won on a drawing of lots.

Finals 

Uruguay won 3–1 on points.

Goal scorers 

With three goals, Jorge Luis Burruchaga, Roberto Dinamite and Carlos Aguilera are the top scorers in the tournament. In total, 55 goals were scored by 40 different players, with none of them credited as own goal.

3 Goals
  Jorge Burruchaga
  Roberto Dinamite
  Carlos Aguilera

2 Goals

  Éder
  Jorge Aravena
  Rodolfo Dubó
  Didí
  Juan Caballero
  Franco Navarro
  Eduardo Malásquez
  Fernando Morena
  Wilmar Cabrera

1 Goal

  Ricardo Gareca
  Víctor Ramos
  Milton Melgar
  David Paniagua
  Silvio Rojas
  Erwin Romero
  Jorginho
  Renato Gaúcho
  Tita
  Oscar Arriaza
  Rubén Espinoza
  Juan Carlos Letelier
  Juan Carlos Orellana
  Fernando Fiorillo
  Nolberto Molina
  Miguel Augusto Prince
  Hans Maldonado
  Lupo Quiñónez
  Galo Fidean Vázquez
  José Jacinto Vega
  Milciades Morel
  Germán Leguía
  Eduardo Mario Acevedo
  Víctor Diogo
  Enzo Francescoli
  Arsenio Luzardo
  Alberto Santelli
  Pedro Febles

References

External links 

 
 
 

 
1983 in South American football
Copa América tournaments